Buckinghamshire is a county in south-east England, surrounded by Northamptonshire to the north, Bedfordshire and Hertfordshire to the east,
Surrey and Berkshire to the south, Greater London to the south-east and Oxfordshire to the west. This ceremonial county has two Unitary Authorities, Buckinghamshire Council and Milton Keynes Council.

In England, Sites of Special Scientific Interest (SSSIs) are designated by Natural England, which is responsible for protecting England's natural environment. Designation as an SSSI gives legal protection to the most important wildlife and geological sites. As of April 2016, there are 65 SSSIs in this Area of Search, 55 of which have been designated for biological interest and 10 for geological interest. Thirty are in the Chilterns Area of Outstanding Natural Beauty, three are in national nature reserves, four are in Special Areas of Conservation, and seventeen are managed by the Berkshire, Buckinghamshire and Oxfordshire Wildlife Trust.

Sites

Key

See also

List of Local Nature Reserves in Buckinghamshire

Notes

References

 
Buckinghamshire
Sites of Special